Nikki is a town, arrondissement, and commune located in the Borgou Department of Benin. The commune covers an area of 3171 square kilometres and as of 2002 had a population of 99,251 people.

It was the site of the "race to Nikki" in 1894.

Nikki is a major centre of the Bariba people and is home to a traditional king, resident in the centre of the town. The Fête de la Gani royal festival is held in the town annually.

History

Foundation
The capital of the kingdom of Nikki was originally Ouénou.

Among the ethnic groups and peoples living in Ouénou, the Baatoumbou were a hierarchical people with a king at the top with the title Ouénou-Sounon. Around 1480, the Wassangari arrived in the region under the leadership of their leader Mansa Doro. Séro, his groom, was then chosen as head of the community which remained in the region and which was organized on the model of Ouénou-Sounon; in particular the chiefdoms by activities which still exist today.

Palace of the King of Nikki.
He married three baatoumbou women, with whom he had five children, of whom Simé is the youngest son. During a hunting trip, Simé identified the site; as the place was humid, he would have said: “Ya niké – nikérou san” (in bariba: “it’s humid”) from which the name Nikki would be derived.

Simé would have established his residence there but his father Séro and his two sisters Gnon Doué and Bona doué remained in Ouénou for the rest of their lives.

The city, from a princely city, became the royal city of the Baribas, Baatoumbou or Batombou.

Notable people
Benin minister Aurélie Adam Soule was born here in 1984.

References

Communes of Benin

Populated places in Benin